Charles Norris Cochrane (August 21, 1889 – November 23, 1945) was a Canadian historian and philosopher who taught at the University of Toronto. He is known for his writings about the interaction between ancient Rome and emerging Christianity.

Early life and education
Cochrane was born in Omemee, Ontario. He attended the University of Toronto, graduating with a degree in Classics in 1911. He then attended the University of Oxford.

Career
During the First World War, Cochrane was active in the Canadian Officers Training Corps and in 1918 went overseas with the 1st Tank Battalion.

After the war, in 1919, Cochrane joined the Faculty of Ancient History at the University of Toronto.

His Thucydides and the Science of History appeared in 1929, and his best-known work, Christianity and Classical Culture, in 1940. The latter work was praised by W.H. Auden, and it was in addition described by Harold Innis as "the first major Canadian contribution to the intellectual history of the West".  In it Cochrane investigated the political and cultural interaction between the Romans and Christians in the early days of Christianity.

In 2017, a new collection of Cochrane's post-humously published writings and collected essays appeared, Augustine and the Problem of Power: The Essays and Lectures of Charles Norris Cochrane.  The title essay in this volume was originally delivered as the 1945 Nathaniel W. Taylor Lectures at Yale University Divinity School. Cochrane expressed the opinion that the philosophy of Augustine largely replaced classical Greek philosophy as the dominant intellectual world view.

In his philosophy and historiography, Cochrane was influenced by R.G. Collingwood.  The Hegelian philosopher James Doull was among his students.  Political scientist Arthur Kroker, pointing to Cochrane's 
writings about the conflict between Christianity and nihilism, and his insight into the "generative origins of Christianity as a response to a larger cultural crisis that secular thought, whether Roman or Greek, could not solve for itself," deemed Cochrane "one of the leading 20th-century philosophers of civilization."

Cochraine died November 13, 1945 in Toronto.

References

External links

 
 
 George Grant on Charles Norris Cochrane
 William E. Heise on Charles Norris Cochrane's Christianity and Classical Culture
 Charles Norris Cochrane archival papers held at the University of Toronto Archives and Records Management Services

1945 deaths
1889 births
20th-century Canadian historians
20th-century Canadian philosophers
Alumni of the University of Oxford
Canadian male non-fiction writers
University of Toronto alumni
Academic staff of the University of Toronto